Iron Springs (also Ironsprings) is an unincorporated community in central Yavapai County, Arizona, United States, in the Prescott National Forest.  It lies along Iron Springs Road northwest of the city of Prescott, the county seat of Yavapai County.  Its elevation is 6,073 feet (1,851 m).  Although Iron Springs is unincorporated, it has a post office, with the ZIP code of 86330.

Originally summer homes, it continues to this day as a year round retreat.

See also
General Land Office
Santa Fe, Prescott and Phoenix Railway
Arizona Territory
George U. Young
Prescott, Arizona
Binger Hermann
Highland Park, Yavapai County, Arizona

Climate
According to the Köppen Climate Classification system, Iron Springs has a semi-arid climate, abbreviated "BSk" on climate maps.

References

Unincorporated communities in Yavapai County, Arizona
Unincorporated communities in Arizona